The 1930 Gonzaga Bulldogs football team was an American football team that represented Gonzaga University as an independent during the 1930 college football season. In their first and only year under head coach Ray Flaherty, the Bulldogs compiled a 1–7–1 record and was outscored by a total of 173 to 55.

Schedule

References

Gonzaga
Gonzaga Bulldogs football seasons
Gonzaga Bulldogs football